The 2009 Vanderbilt Commodores football team represented Vanderbilt University during the 2009–10 college football season. The team's head coach was Bobby Johnson, who served his eighth season as the Commodores' head coach. Vanderbilt has been a member of the Southeastern Conference (SEC) since the league's inception in 1932, and has participated in that conference's Eastern Division since its formation in 1992. The Commodores played their six home games at Vanderbilt Stadium at Dudley Field in Nashville, Tennessee, which has been Vanderbilt football's home stadium since 1922. The Commodores finished the season 2–10 and 0–8 in SEC play.

Coaching staff
Bobby Johnson - Head Coach
Ted Cain - Offensive Coordinator and Tight Ends Coach
Bruce Fowler - Defensive Coordinator
Robbie Caldwell - Assistant Head Coach/Offensive Line Coach
Rick Logo - Defensive Line Coach
Warren Belin - Linebackers Coach and Recruiting Coordinator
Jamie Bryant - Defensive Backs Coach and Special Teams Coordinator
Charlie Fisher - Co-Passing Game Coordinator & Wide Receivers
Jimmy Kiser - Co-Passing Game Coordinator & Quarterbacks
Desmond Kitchings - Running Backs Coach
Michael Hazel - Assistant Director of Football Operations
Joey Orck - Offensive Quality Control
Andy Frank - Defensive Quality Control
Norval McKenzie - Offensive Graduate Assistant
Mark Moehring - Defensive Graduate Assistant
Tom Bossung - Head Athletic Trainer
Brian Reese - Associate Director of Student Athletics
John Sisk - Director of Speed, Strength and Conditioning
Luke Wyatt - Head Equipment Manager
 Gary Veach - Assistant Equipment Manager

Schedule

Game summaries

Western Carolina

LSU

Mississippi State

Rice

Ole Miss

Army

Georgia

South Carolina

Georgia Tech

Florida

Kentucky

Tennessee

References

Vanderbilt
Vanderbilt Commodores football seasons
Vanderbilt Commodores football